Happy Little Submarine Magic Box of Time is a 2015 Chinese animated adventure film directed by He Zili. It was released in China on May 29, 2015.

Voice cast
Fan Churong
Hong Haitian
Xie Yuanzhen
Wang Yanhua
Tan ManTang
Li Ye

Box office
By June 1, 2015, the film had earned  at the Chinese box office.

See also
Happy Little Submarines 4: Adventure of Octopus (2014)

References

2015 animated films
2015 films
2010s adventure films
Animated adventure films
Chinese animated films